Decatur County Industrial Air Park  is a county-owned public-use airport located six nautical miles (11 km) northwest of the central business district of Bainbridge, a city in Decatur County, Georgia, United States.

Facilities and aircraft
It has two asphalt paved runways: 9/27 is 5,502 by 150 feet (1,677 x 46 m); 14/32 is 5,003 by 100 feet (1,525 x 30 m).

For the 12-month period ending April 7, 2015, the airport had 15,000 aircraft operations, an average of 42 per day: 98% general aviation and 2% military. At that time there were 44 aircraft based at this airport: 95% single-engine and 4% multi-engine.

History
Following entry of the United States into World War II, the Chief of the Army Air Corps directed the Air Corps Flying Training Command Southeast Training Center to immediately take action to select air base sites needed to increase its pilot training rate to meet anticipated wartime demands.

A level area near Bainbridge, seven miles (11 km) northwest of the City adjacent to the Seaboard Air Line Railroad was selected by the Air Corps, and the City of Bainbridge and Decatur County purchased  for $66,800 and then leased the property to the Army for $1 per annum  for a basic flight training base authorizing 89.9 million for its construction.

The contractor broke ground on 3 April 1942, for Bainbridge Army Airfield.  The immediate construction involved runways and airplane hangars, with concrete runways, several taxiways and a large parking apron and a control tower. Several large hangars were also constructed.  Initial construction reached completion on 25 August.

During World War II, the airfield conducted flight training of new pilots by Army Air Forces Flying Training Command. It was closed on 24 December 1944.  With the airfield's closure, the Army Air Force gifted the base to the City and County.

There was little need, however, for the airfield, and in the immediate postwar years, farmers leased the open areas of the airfield for cultivation and the cantonment area was used for various purposes.

As a result of the Korean War which began in 1950 and the expansion of the United States Air Force, Bainbridge Air Base* was reopened to train additional pilots.  The base was inactivated and returned to civilian control on 31 March 1961.

Today, Bainbridge is used for various purposes in addition to a small amount of aviation activity. On the former base are several manufacturing plants. For a time, the Southern Airways built student housing was used by a mental health facility. Some of the remaining Southern Airways buildings are occupied by the Georgia Department of Corrections as a prison. The golf course built in the 1950s is still in use, and the World War II hangars are still in use.

Through the years a lot of material has been gathered about the Southern Airways School and Bainbridge Air Base. The information is located at the Decatur County Museum.

References
 Shettle, M. L. (2005), Georgia's Army Airfields of World War II.

External links
 Decatur County Industrial Air Park page at Georgia DOT Aviation website
 
 

1942 establishments in Georgia (U.S. state)
Airports established in 1942
Airports in Georgia (U.S. state)
Buildings and structures in Decatur County, Georgia
Transportation in Decatur County, Georgia